Zoran Pešić (born 14 July 1983) is a Serbian rugby league footballer, who currently plays for French club RC Carpentras XIII in the Elite Two Championship. He has represented Serbia many times, and played at club level for London Skolars, Eastmoor Dragons, Warrington Wizards, Red Star Rugby League Club and Lyon Villeurbanne XIII.

References

External links
 Leagueunlimited.com

1983 births
Living people
Expatriate rugby league players in England
London Skolars players
Lyon Villeurbanne XIII players
RC Carpentras XIII players
Red Star Rugby League Club players
Rugby league hookers
Serbia national rugby league team players
Serbian expatriate rugby league players
Serbian expatriate sportspeople in England
Serbian expatriate sportspeople in France
Serbian rugby league players
Woolston Rovers players